Ramata Parish is an administrative unit of Valmiera Municipality in the Vidzeme region of Latvia. Prior to 2009, it was an administrative unit of the former Valmiera District. The administrative center is Ramata village.

Towns, villages and settlements of Ramata parish 
 Kundziņi
 Nuķis
 Ramata
 Talcis
 Vērsis

References 

Parishes of Latvia
Valmiera Municipality
Vidzeme